Emma (or Emme) of Anjou (c.1140–c.1214) was an illegitimate daughter of Geoffrey Plantagenet, Count of Anjou, and half-sister of King Henry II of England. She was married to Dafydd ab Owain Gwynedd, a Welsh prince. She is occasionally confused with Emma de Laval (1200-1264), the daughter of Guy V de Laval.
Emma married Dafydd in the summer of 1174, after an unsuccessful rebellion by the queen, Eleanor of Aquitaine, and her older sons had led her half-brother the king to disperse Eleanor's court in Aquitaine and bring Emma back to England.

Emma had four children by Dafydd:

 Owain
 Einion
 Gwenllian
 Gwenhwyfar, who married one Meurig ap Roger, the son of a Powys nobleman who had allied himself with Henry II

In 1176, after her husband's rule in the Kingdom of Gwynedd had been challenged by his brother, Emma is known to have visited King Henry II and received a gift of manors in Shropshire and Worcestershire. After Henry's death in 1189, she continued to attempt to protect her children's interests by making representations to Henry's heirs.

In 1196, Emma and her husband, at the request of their son, Owain, gave property to Haughmond Abbey. Shortly afterwards, Dafydd was deposed by his nephew, Llywelyn the Great, and was forced into exile in England, where he died in 1203.

References

1140s births
1210s deaths
12th-century French women
12th-century French people